Lynne McGranger (born 29 January 1953) is an Australian actress and longest serving female cast member of a television soap opera in Australia, having starred as Irene Roberts on soap opera Home and Away for over 30 years. She joined the series in 1993, taking over from actress Jacquy Phillips who originally portrayed the character of Irene from 1991 to 1992.

Career
McGranger was born to Bruce and Audrey. She originally was a primary school teacher who trained at the Riverina College of Advanced Education in Wagga Wagga, New South Wales, in 1975 where she had her initial actor training. She started her career in stage roles, early roles included Rose in Bye Bye Birdie and Anita in West Side Story. After further experience with the Q Theatre in Penrith, west of Sydney, she started working in television and won a small part in soap opera The Flying Doctors.

She undertook her best-known role on 12 January 1993, when she joined the cast of Home and Away playing Irene Roberts. At first cast in a guest role, McGranger was made a permanent cast member on 7 October 1993. In 2014 McGranger overtook former co-star Kate Ritchie as the longest serving actress to play the same character in Australian television.

McGranger was a participant in the fourteenth season of Dancing with the Stars. She regularly appears in British pantomimes during the Christmas season, and has starred in pantomimes in Brighton, Torquay, York and Ashton-under-Lyne and Southport.

Personal life
McGranger was born in the Sydney suburb of Paddington in 1953. She has one daughter, Clancy (b. 1991), with her husband 
of more than thirty years, Paul McWaters. She is a keen fan of cricket, and is also interested in history. McGranger is also a supporter of the Sydney Swans.
McGranger's maternal grandfather Godfrey Allum was organist at St Paul's Cathedral Melbourne and wrote a number of Organ Preludes (The Australian Organist May 1988).

References

External links
 
 

1953 births
Living people
Australian soap opera actresses